Çağla Kubat (born 16 November 1978) is a Turkish model, actress and windsurfer who is member of Fenerbahçe sailing & windsurfing team. She is 5 feet 10 (1.80m) tall.

She was born in İzmir. She graduated from Italian High School of Istanbul and Istanbul Technical University with a bachelor's degree in mechanical engineering. She was the first runner-up for the Miss Turkey 2002 beauty pageant and represented Turkey at Miss Universe 2002.

She speaks English and Italian fluently.

Sports
Çağla is also a champion windsurfer, having won the IFCA windsurfing European Slalom Championship in 2005, in Alaçatı. In 2006, in her first PWA (Professional Windsurfers Association) event, she placed 6th in IFCA Slalom World Championship.

She founded her own windsurfing school "Çağla Kubat Windsurf Academy" in Alaçatı, İzmir Province. She ranked third in the women's category at the 2012 World Slalom Championship in Spain. In 2013, she became champion in the Master Female Slalom category of the IFCA Junior, Youth & Masters Slalom World Championships held in Alaçatı. She took the third rank at the 2013 World Cup.

Çağla Kubat's pastimes besides windsurfing are snowboarding, wakeboarding, rollerblading, horseback riding and scuba diving and playing tennis.

Acting
She starred in successful leading female roles in two Turkish TV series to date. These are Sağır Oda ("The deaf room") in 2006 and Kuzey Rüzgarı ("The northern wind") with Kadir İnanır and Oktay Kaynarca. She also had a leading role on Arka Sokaklar from 2009 to 2011.

Personal life
Çağla Kubat married American surfer Jimmy Diaz on 21 September 2013.

References

External links

 Official website
 Çağla Kubat sailor profile (page 6) at  Professional Windsurfers Association

1978 births
20th-century Turkish actresses
Female windsurfers
Fenerbahçe windsurfers
Istanbul Technical University alumni
Liceo Italiano alumni
Living people
Miss Universe 2002 contestants
Sportspeople from İzmir
Turkish beauty pageant winners
Turkish female models
Turkish mechanical engineers
Turkish sportswomen
Turkish television actresses
Turkish windsurfers